is a single released by Japanese pop and R&B singer-songwriter Kana Nishino. It was released on June 3, 2009, by her record label SME Records.

Track listing

Oricon Charts (Japan)

Kana Nishino songs
2009 singles
Japanese-language songs
Songs written by Jeff Miyahara
SME Records singles
2009 songs